Fiona Victoria Gubelmann is an American actress. She has appeared in a number of single-episode roles in television, including CSI: NY, My Name Is Earl and Knight Rider, as well as a handful of films including Employee of the Month and Downstream. She starred as Jenna in the 2011–2014 FX comedy series Wilfred. Gubelmann stars as Dr. Morgan Reznick in the ABC medical drama The Good Doctor.

Early life
Fiona Gubelmann was born in Santa Monica, California. She began acting and dancing in preschool, and her mother enrolled her in dance classes as a child. Her first play was at the age of four in a ballet version of The Cabbage Patch Kids. As a child and teenager, she attended drama camps in the summer, acted in local community theater, and became involved in the drama department at her school, Torrey Pines High School in Del Mar, California. She enrolled at the University of California, Los Angeles (UCLA), where she was a pre-medical major. She successfully auditioned for a play during her freshman year. She found she enjoyed acting so much that she switched her major to theater. During her time as an undergraduate, she volunteered with ArtsBridge, a program for at-risk youth in the Los Angeles area.

She graduated from UCLA in 2002, and went on to study acting at the Beverly Hills Playhouse (performing in plays with the organization's Katselas Theater Company).

Career

Gubelmann made her television acting debut in 2003 on the UPN sitcom The Mullets, and made her film debut the following year in the comedy Employee of the Month. She appeared as a guest star in a number of television series and in a few films over the next several years. She also continued stage work, appearing in Peter Lefcourt's play La Ronde de Lunch in Los Angeles in 2009.

When Gubelmann's agent sent her the script for Wilfred, she said that she "absolutely fell in love with it", although "didn't quite get the whole guy in the dog suit thing". She watched some of the original Australian version online, and described her reaction as "Oh my God, this is amazing!" After auditioning, she was called back several more times over the course of three and half weeks. She also auditioned with Elijah Wood and Jason Gann so producers could see if she had on-screen chemistry with her potential co-stars, and was tested a final time before winning the role.

In 2014, she and her husband, Alex, were featured in an episode of the House Hunters spin-off House Hunters Renovation where they were shown buying and renovating their new home.

Gubelmann has appeared in two Lifetime movies and four Hallmark movies.

Gubelmann started appearing on The Good Doctor as Dr. Morgan Reznick in a recurring role in the first season and was promoted to a series regular in the second season.

Filmography

Film

Television

Web

References

External links
 
 
 
 

21st-century American actresses
Actresses from Santa Monica, California
American film actresses
American television actresses
Living people
University of California, Los Angeles alumni
Year of birth missing (living people)